Mian Deh (also Romanized as Mīān Deh; also known as Deh-e Mīān) is a village in Kiskan Rural District, in the Central District of Baft County, Kerman Province, Iran. At the 2006 census, its population was 123, in 34 families.

References 

Populated places in Baft County